Chelidonura hirundinina is a species of small and colorful aglajid sea slug, a shell-less opisthobranch gastropod mollusk in the family Aglajidae.

The variety Chelidonura hirundinina var. punctata Eliot, 1903 has been elevated to the species Chelidonura punctata Eliot, 1903

Despite its colorful appearance, this is not a species of nudibranch; it is a cephalaspidean, a headshield slug. This is a tropical species which lives in the western Indo-Pacific, and also in the Caribbean Sea.

Description
This species has a maximum size of 40 mm, but is often smaller than that. The background color can be red, orange, dark brown, or black. There are blue, black, and orange stripes on the body, and there is a white marking towards the posterior end of the animal.

The two rather long "tails" at the end of the animal are characteristic of the genus Chelidonura. They have also well-developed sensory cilia on the anterior edge of the head which are used to find the prey.

The specific epithet hirundinina is Latin, meaning "little swallow", in reference to this swallow-tailed appearance.

Life habits
This species eats flatworms and has a diurnal activity.

References

 Rosenberg, G., F. Moretzsohn, and E. F. García. 2009. Gastropoda (Mollusca) of the Gulf of Mexico, Pp. 579–699 in Felder, D.L. and D.K. Camp (eds.), Gulf of Mexico–Origins, Waters, and Biota. Biodiversity. Texas A&M Press, College Station, Texas.

Books
 Valdez, Hamann, Berhrens & DuPont, 2006, Caribbean sea slugs: a field guide to the opisthobranch mollusks from the tropical northwestern Atlantic, Sea Challengers Natural History Books, Washington

External links
 Sea Slug Forum: 
  Spencer H.G., Willan R.C., Marshall B.A. & Murray T.J. (2011) Checklist of the Recent Mollusca Recorded from the New Zealand Exclusive Economic Zone
 Yonow N. (2012) Opisthobranchs from the western Indian Ocean, with descriptions of two new species and ten new records (Mollusca, Gastropoda). ZooKeys 197: 1–129. [22 May 2012] 
 Chelidonura hirundinina at Worldwide Mollusc Species Data Base (WMSDB)
 

Aglajidae
Fauna of Western Australia
Gastropods described in 1833